{{Infobox organization
| name          = Armenian National Committee of America
| image         = Armenian National Committee of America Logo.png
| size          = 125px
| formation     = 1918 (as ACIA)1941 (as ANCA)
| type          = NGO
| status        = 
| purpose       = Advocacy
| headquarters  = 1711 N Street NW, Washington, D.C.
| language      = English, Armenian
| general       = 
| leader_title  = Executive director
| leader_name   = Aram Hamparian
| leader_title2 = Chairman
| leader_name2  = Raffi Hamparian
| budget        = 
| website       = 
| former name   = American Committee for the Independence of Armenia (ACIA)<ref>{{Cite web |url=http://intersci.ss.uci.edu/wiki/eBooks/Articles/Success%20of%20Armenian%20Lobbies%20Gregg.pdf |title=Heather S. Gregg, Divided They Conquer: The Success of Armenian Ethnic Lobbies in the US |access-date=2012-04-03 |archive-url=https://web.archive.org/web/20171011092402/http://intersci.ss.uci.edu/wiki/eBooks/Articles/Success%20of%20Armenian%20Lobbies%20Gregg.pdf |archive-date=2017-10-11 |url-status=dead }}</ref>
}}

The Armenian National Committee of America (ANCA) an Armenian American grassroots organization. Its headquarters is in Washington, D.C., and it has regional offices in Glendale, California, and  Watertown, Massachusetts.

History
The ANCA was founded as ACIA in 1918 and was then founded as the ANCA in 1941. The ANCA is an outgrowth of the American Committee for the Independence of Armenia (ACIA) which was founded after World War I by Vahan Cardashian, the former Consul of the Ottoman Empire in Washington. Many prominent American and Allied leaders including James W. Gerard, the U.S. Ambassador to Germany, Senator Henry Cabot Lodge, Charles Evans Hughes (later appointed Chief Justice of the U.S. Supreme Court), Elihu Root and others participated to this organization. The goal of ACIA was the independent Wilsonian Armenia. The ACIA had a Central Office in New York City and 23 regional offices in 13 states.

Later, these offices gradually evolved into the Armenian National Committee of America, which expanded its activities to include public relations efforts to acquaint local communities about Armenian issues including the Armenian genocide and Armenian National aspirations. Other activities included April 24 commemoration activities, public forums, voter registration efforts, support for local and state political candidates, and updating the local community on Armenian issues.

The ANCA is active in different areas of political and educational activities, including:
initiating the legislation on issues of concern to the Armenian American community, such as strengthening Armenia as a secure, prosperous and democratic state; supporting Nagorno Karabakh's right to self-determination and independence within secure borders; etc.
participation in the American electoral process at the federal, state, and local levels by educating elected officials about Armenian American issues and providing Armenian American voters with up-to-date information about the positions of candidates on Armenian American concerns.
publication of congressional testimony, position papers, press releases, fact sheets, and regional newsletters.

Beyond the national headquarters of the ANCA located in Washington, there are two regional offices in New York City and Los Angeles, and more than fifty local chapters and thousands of activists, it is cooperating with a large web of regional Armenian National Committees (or Armenian Cause/Hay Tad'' Offices) in Armenia, Russia, France, the Middle East, Canada, South America, and Australia.

1990–1999 

Since the early 1990s, the ANCA has defended Section 907 of the Freedom Support Act, restricting aid to the government of Azerbaijan.

2000–2009 

The ANCA was among the major organizations backing US House Resolution 106 which called for the United States to recognize the Armenian genocide committed by the Ottoman Empire during World War I.

2010–2019 
On 25 May 2017, the ANCA issued a statement against Donald Trump's budget, which would cut 69.6% of the aid to Armenia. The ANCA stated: "We are troubled by Trump's ill-advised and misguided proposal to cut aid to Armenia."

2020–present

2022 Los Angeles City Council Scandal 
Following the 2022 Los Angeles City Council scandal, ANCA-WR's official response stated:

2022 United States Elections 
For the 2022 Los Angeles mayoral election, ANCA-WR endorsed Karen Bass for mayor. In response, Bass stated "The Armenian community deserves a Mayor who will prioritize issues that are often overlooked. For the past few decades, I have worked to hold Azerbaijan accountable and support the people of Artsakh. I have fought to combat anti-Armenian hate, and ensured that I have Armenian representation in senior staff roles in my elected offices. The work that ANCA-Western Region does is incredibly important in fighting for the best interests of the Armenian community and as Mayor, I vow to continue to help in that fight." Following Bass' victory, Nora Hovsepian, the chair of the ANCA-WR board of directors, was named to serve on the transition team.

Positions and activities

Support for Artsakh
ANCA has a policy of generating increased U.S. support for the security and prosperity of the independent Republic of Artsakh, through initiatives challenging Azerbaijan’s aggression, strengthening U.S.-Artsakh ties, appropriating direct U.S. aid, and supporting the OSCE Minsk Group’s efforts to resolve the Artsakh-Azerbaijan status and security issues.

U.S.–Armenia Ties
ANCA works to improve the strategic U.S.–Armenia partnership in terms of expanding trade; increasing aid; further developing mutually-beneficial political, economic, security, military, and peacekeeping cooperation; and elevating the frequency of bilateral visits at both head of state and government levels.

LGBTQ+ rights
At a 2010 GALAS LGBTQ+ Armenian Society conference, entitled "Breaking Through: Legally, Politically, Culturally," ANCA participated in a panel discussion focused on political issues important to the Armenian and LGBT communities, ANCA Chairman Raffi Hamparian stated:

Leadership
The Chairman of ANCA is Raffi Hamparian. The staff is composed of Executive Director Aram Hamparian, Communications Director Elizabeth S. Chouldjian, Government Affairs Director Raffi N. Karakashian, Esq., and Chief Financial Officer Christopher Hekimian.

See also

 Armenia–United States relations

References

External links

ANC of Central California Official site
An interview with ANCA executive director Aram Hamparian 

1918 establishments in the United States
Organizations established in 1918
Political advocacy groups in the United States
Armenian Revolutionary Federation
Armenian-American history
Armenia–United States relations
Artsakh–United States relations